Adrien Grondin (born 6 October 1996) is a French professional squash player. He competed at the 2015 Men's World Junior Squash Championships. He achieved his highest career PSA ranking of 318 in February 2016 during the 2015–16 PSA World Tour.

References

External links 
 
 

1999 births
Living people
French male squash players
French expatriates in England
20th-century French people
21st-century French people